Lamed (lit. 30), also Tokhnit Lamed (lit. Plan 30), is a residential neighborhood of Tel Aviv, Israel. It is located in the northwestern part of the city.

Most of its structures were built in the 1970s.

A 2016 poll by Walla! ranked Lamed as Israel's most beloved urban neighborhood.

References

Neighborhoods of Tel Aviv